Mchedlidze is a Georgian surname. Notable people with the surname include:

 Guram Mchedlidze (1931–2009), Georgian biologist
 Levan Mchedlidze (born 1990), Georgian footballer
 Nana Mchedlidze (1926-2016), Georgian film director, actress and screenwriter
 Tamaz Mchedlidze (born 1993), Georgian rugby union player

Georgian-language surnames